Harger is a surname. Notable people with the surname include:

 Elaine Harger, American librarian
 Honor Harger (born 1975), New Zealand curator and artist 
 Nathan Harger, American photographer
 Oscar Harger (1843–1887), American paleontologist and invertebrate zoologist

See also
 Barger